TCPaccess is a software product which implements the TCP/IP protocol suite on IBM mainframe computers using the MVS operating system.  It was developed in 1986 by Advanced Computer Communications under the name ACCES/MVS, and was the first commercial TCP/IP implementation for MVS mainframes.  It is usually associated with Interlink Computer Sciences, which developed and marketed the product from 1990 until 1999, and is frequently referred to as "the Interlink stack".
The product was marketed by Cisco Systems as Cisco IOS for S/390.  It is currently offered by Computer Associates as Unicenter TCPaccess Communications Server.

External links
 Cisco IOS for S/390 – From Cisco Systems.

Internet Protocol based network software
IBM mainframe software